Fr. John J. Crowley (December 8, 1891 - March 17, 1940), often referred to as the Desert Padre, was an early 20th century Catholic priest in California's large but sparsely populated Eastern Sierra.  He served there from 1919 to 1940, with an interlude, mainly in Fresno, from about 1924 to 1934. He is remembered  for his prodigious efforts to help improve the economic well-being of all Eastern Sierra residents (not just the Catholics, of whom there were about 600) whose lives had been adversely affected by the diversion of water from the Owens Valley to the rapidly growing but water-deficient Los Angeles area (see: California water wars)

Life
He was a native of Ireland who came to the US (Worcester, MA) with his family when he was 11 years old. He was the eldest of 4 brothers and 4 sisters.  His father died only a few years after immigration, leaving the family in difficult economic conditions.  John took a family leadership role and "learned responsibility that served him well in his later career".  He studied at Holy Cross College in Worcester, earning a Bachelor of Arts degree in 1915.  His faculty prefect described him as "one of the best young men Holy Cross has reared in recent years . . .".  He was ordained a priest of the Catholic Church in 1918, and shortly thereafter, now Father Crowley, he left to take up a position in Southern California, where priests were especially needed.  He served for about a year in the Los Angeles area, then volunteered (and was subsequently appointed) to be the lone priest for the Eastern Sierra.  In 1924 he was chosen, because of his much admired administrative abilities, to be Chancellor to the newly created Roman Catholic Diocese of Monterey-Fresno. In 1925 he was anointed Monsignor by Pope Pius XI. In 1940 he died in an automobile accident on the highway now known as California State Route 14, when he hit a wandering cow and was deflected head on into an oncoming truck.
  
His efforts in the Eastern Sierra centered largely on enhancing tourism to the remarkable area, which includes the lowest geographical point, in Death Valley, and the highest point (at that time, among the 48 states), Mount Whitney.  Nature lovers, campers, hikers, and sport fisher persons were addressed; stars in the many movies filmed in the area were engaged, etc.  His remarkable achievements were the subject of an essay by Irving Stone in 1944, which was a featured article in The Saturday Evening Post.

Eponymy

Crowley Lake

Crowley Lake, which formed behind a dam built by the Los Angeles Department of Water and Power to help regulate the flow of water to Los Angeles,
was named in honor of Fr. Crowley.

Father Crowley Vista Point
Now within Death Valley National Park, the Vista Point overlooks Rainbow Canyon and the dramatic western approach to the Panamint Range and Telescope Peak, on the other side of which lies Death Valley.

Father Crowley's lupine

This rare lupinus species, officially classified as Lupinus padre-crowleyi in 1945 and commonly called Father Crowley's lupine, occurs in a few high elevation areas on the eastern slopes of the Sierra Nevada.

References

External links
 http://www.owensvalleyhistory.com/father_crowley/page59.html 
 https://www.youtube.com/watch?v=gXnBBxt-JWM&ab_channel=TalesAlongElCaminoSierra
 DeDecker's Lupine, Lupinus padre-crowleyi C. P. Smith (Fabaceae) | Who's in a Name  
 https://www.catholic.org/featured/headline.php?ID=1576

1891 births
1940 deaths
Road incident deaths in California